Legua is a genus of grasshoppers in the subfamily Romaleinae; described by Walker in 1870.

References

Caelifera genera
Romaleidae